Oksana Anatolievna Klimova (born 24 May 1992) is a Russian former competitive ice dancer. She competed with Sasha Palomäki for Finland from 2007 to 2010. They are the 2009 & 2010 Finnish national champions. They teamed up in summer 2007.

Competitive highlights
(with Palomäki)

 J = Junior level

References

Navigation

External links

 

1992 births
Finnish female ice dancers
Living people
Figure skaters from Moscow